Poliaenus concolor is a species of beetle in the family Cerambycidae. It was described by Schaeffer in 1909. It is known from Baja California.

References

Pogonocherini
Beetles described in 1909